Contragolpe is a 1979 Argentine drama film directed by Alejandro Doria.

Cast
Marcelo Alfaro	... 	Gigolo 1
Enrique Alonso
Alberto Argibay
Raúl Aubel
Aldo Barbero
Sergio Bellotti
Héctor Bidonde
Luisina Brando
Rodolfo Brindisi
Cecilia Cenci
Marta Cerain
Martín Coria	... 	Detenido
Lito Cruz	... 	Juan de Dios Tolosa / Carmelo Di Prisco
Felice D'Amore
Héctor da Rosa
Ricardo Fassan
Ana María Giunta
Adela Gleijer
Jorge Marrale
Daniel Miglioranza
Gloria Necon
Julio Pelieri
Ignacio Quirós
Gigi Rua
Tina Serrano
Juan Manuel Tenuta
Osvaldo Terranova
Beatriz Thibaudin

External links
 

1979 films
1970s Spanish-language films
1979 drama films
Films directed by Alejandro Doria
Argentine drama films
1970s Argentine films